Manju Manikuttan (born ) is an Indian beautician and social worker. She rescued people who had been conned to be come servants in Arabia. She was awarded the Nari Shakti Puraskar which is the highest award for women in India.

Life
Manikuttan was born and raised in the Ernakulam district in Kerala. She became a beautician and she worked in Saudi Arabia where she lived in the port city of Dammam with her husband and two children.

She rescued people who had been conned to become servants in Arabia. She was nominated for an award for her work which was given by the President Ram Nath Kovind at the Presidential Palace in New Delhi on International Women's Day in 2019. She was awarded the Nari Shakti Puraskar which is an Indian "national award in recognition for exceptional work for women's empowerment". She met the minister Maneka Gandhi and afterwards she met the Prime Minister Narendra Modi. She was the only woman to receive the award that year who did not live in India.

In 2020 the New Indian Express reported the example of "Chandrika" who had left India for Saudi Arabia to work as an accountant in a hospital. When she arrived sfe discovered that she had been misled and the job she was assigned was as a housemaid. "Chandrika" stuck the job for five months but finally her employer took her to the airport but her situation led to a fight and she could have been arrested. However Maniuttan was summoned and she took her back to her own home where she stayed until a new route home could be organised. Her work as a volunteer is part of the work of the Navayugam Samskarika Vedi organisation. Presently she is the Central Committee Vice president of Navayugam. Over five years she has worked with hundreds of expatriots who are generally maids recruited from Telangana, Andhra Pradesh, Tamil Nadu and Kerala. She is supported in her work by the Indian Embassy in Riyadh and the Deportation Centre in Dammam.

References

Social workers
Nari Shakti Puraskar winners
People from Kerala
Living people
1970s births
Year of birth uncertain